Robert Chiappetta is an American television writer and lawyer.

Career
Chiappetta, along with his writing partner Glen Whitman, served as executive story editors on the FOX crime/mystery series Fringe, and contributed several scripts to the show as well. Chiapetta and Whitman were science advisors to the creators of Fringe before its first season began.

Fringe episodes
 "Ability" (season 1, ep. 14) (teleplay by co-executive producer David H. Goodman, based on a story by Whitman and Chiappetta)
 "Of Human Action" (season 2, ep. 7)
 "The Bishop Revival" (season 2, ep. 4)
 "6955 kHz" (season 3, ep. 6)
 "6B" (season 3, ep. 14)
 "And Those We've Left Behind" (season 4, ep. 6)
 "A Better Human Being" (season 4, ep. 13) (teleplay by co-executive producers Alison Schapker and Monica Owusu-Breen, based on a story by Chiappetta and Whitman)

References

External links 

American television writers
American male television writers
American writers of Italian descent
Living people
Year of birth missing (living people)
Place of birth missing (living people)
People of Calabrian descent